Tasmanians for a Better Future is a group of concerned business and community members that was formed in the lead up to the 2006 Tasmanian state election.

The group placed many advertisements encouraging people to vote for majority government to avoid risking a minority government being elected, which they argued would be disastrous for commerce and industry within the state. Prior minority governments during the 1990s had presided over rising unemployment and state debt, negative growth and falling business investment, with pro-environmental, anti-business legislation forced upon by the Tasmanian Greens considered partly to blame.

The advertisements were under the name of Tony Harrison, who runs the Corporate Communications public relations company.

See also

Parliament of Tasmania

References

Politics of Tasmania